Arthropeas is a genus of flies in the family Xylophagidae.

Species
Arthropeas americana Loew, 1861
Arthropeas fenestralis Malloch, 1932
Arthropeas magna Johnson, 1913
Arthropeas sachalinensis Matsumura, 1916
Arthropeas semifusca Malloch, 1932
Arthropeas sibirica Loew, 1850

References

Xylophagidae
Brachycera genera
Taxa named by Hermann Loew
Diptera of Asia
Diptera of North America